This is the complete list of Olympic medalists in golf.

Current program

Men's individual

Women's individual

Discontinued event

Men's team

References

Golf

Olympic